Hang On Ramsey! is a live album by the Ramsey Lewis Trio which was recorded at the Lighthouse in 1965 and released on the Cadet label.

Reception

Allmusic awarded the album 3 stars stating "Considering that this album was an obvious follow-up to The In Crowd it is surprising that the music is not more commercial; that would happen in the near future. As it was, pianist Ramsey Lewis (assisted as usual by bassist Eldee Young and drummer Redd Holt) had another big hit in "Hang on Sloopy," and the set (as with the previous one) was recorded at a club before an enthusiastic crowd.

Track listing
 "A Hard Day's Night"  (John Lennon, Paul McCartney) - 4:56   
 "All My Love Belongs to You" (Sol Winkler, Teddy Powell) - 4:10   
 "He's a Real Gone Guy" (Nellie Lutcher) - 2:19   
 "And I Love Her"  (Lennon, McCartney) - 5:36   
 "Movin' Easy"  (Ramsey Lewis) - 3:00   
 "Billy Boy / Hi-Heel Sneakers" (Traditional / Robert Higgenbotham) - 9:15   
 "The More I See You" (Harry Warren, Mack Gordon) - 4:58   
 "Satin Doll" (Duke Ellington, Billy Strayhorn, Johnny Mercer) - 6:10   
 "Hang On Sloopy" (Bert Russell, Wes Farrell) - 2:40

Personnel 
Ramsey Lewis - piano
Eldee Young - bass
Isaac "Redd" Holt - drums

References 

1965 live albums
Ramsey Lewis live albums
Cadet Records live albums
Albums produced by Esmond Edwards
Albums recorded at the Lighthouse Café